Purushottam Institute of Engineering and Technology (PIET) is a private co-aid undergraduate engineering college located in semi rural part of Mandiakudar of semi urban town Kansbahal. The institute was established in 1999. In the beginning, the institute temporarily functioned in the campus of Biju Patnaik Hockey Stadium, Sector 06 of city Rourkela, with small a number of students and faculty. In 2001 the institute moved to new campus located at Mandiakudar, 30 km away from the city Rourkela.

The institute offered 4 years of undergraduate B.Tech degree with affiliation from Biju Patnaik University of Technology (BPUT). The undergraduate students study courses in streams of CSE, ETE, EEE, IT, AEI and ME. In the year 2007 the institute started courses for MCA and MBA.

The institute is almost one kilometer away from the town of Kansbahal and half a kilometer from IIPM School of Management. The campus has a residential hostel complex built inside the institute campus for students coming from outside of the city. It has a small post office outside the campus entrance gate by the Indian postal department and has a small temple of Lord Hanuman inside.

The institute is located in state highway of SH 10 of Kansbahal and Rourkela.

References

See also 

 Mandiakudar
 Biju Patnaik University of Technology

All India Council for Technical Education
Engineering colleges in Odisha
Business schools in Odisha
Colleges affiliated with Biju Patnaik University of Technology
Education in Sundergarh district
Educational institutions established in 1999
1999 establishments in Orissa